Ana Cecilia Cantu Felix (born September 14, 1985) is a Mexican former competitive figure skater. She is a four-time national champion (2002–2003, 2006-2007, 2007–2008, 2008–2009) and competed at 9 ISU Championships (1 Junior, 4 Senior and 4 Senior Synchro). She is still to-date, the first and only Mexican female skater to qualify to the final segment at the World Figure Skating Championships, in 2009.

Personal life 
Cantu Felix was born on September 14, 1985, in Monterrey, Mexico. She has a younger sister, who also competed internationally in figure skating.
She's currently a World and International level coach.

Career 
Cantu Felix began skating in 1992. In 1998 she was Novice and competed for the first time outside her country at the North American Challenge Skate that took place in Dallas, Texas. In 1999 she finished 6th at the North American Challenge Skate that took place in Toronto, Canada. In 2001, she debuted on the ISU Junior Grand Prix series.

During the 2002–2003 season, Cantu Felix trained in Monterrey coached by Edgar Beckley and Doris Beckley and in  Simsbury, Connecticut, coached by Galina Zmievskaya and the Petrenkos . She was assigned to represent Mexico at three ISU Championships – the 2003 Four Continents in Beijing, China; 2003 Junior Worlds in Ostrava, Czech Republic; and 2003 Worlds in Washington, D.C.

She qualified to the Free skate in Beijing and finished 20th. During the event, Cantu Felix's bag with her skates vanished after the short program but her teammate, Ingrid Roth, who had not advanced to the next segment, lent her own skates to Cantu Felix. Cantu Felix had to compete the Free Program with skates 1 size bigger than hers and a different boot and blade brand that she was used to wear. Nevertheless, she placed better than all her teammates, making her the Mexican elegible by her Federation to represent her country at the 2003 Worlds.

In the 2004–2005 season, Cantu Felix was coached by the Beckleys and Steve Moore in Simsbury. She placed 22nd at the 2005 Four Continents Championships in Gangneung, South Korea. The following 2 seasons she trained by herself in Santa Catarina, Nuevo León, Mexico. She ranked 18th at the 2006 Four Continents Championships in Colorado Springs, Colorado.

In 2007 she began training in Mexico and in Toronto, Ontario, Canada, with Richard O'Neill.

At the 2009 World Championships in Los Angeles, Cantu Felix qualified to the final segment by placing 24th in the short program. She became the first Mexican skater to reach the Free skate in the event's history. She is still currently the only woman to have achieved the final round at a World Championship.

Her programs were choreographed by David Wilson, Mark Hird, Shawn Sawyer and herself. During her last International season as a single skater, she was coached by Vladimir Petrenko and trained at the International Skating Center of Connecticut, in Simsbury.

Her last competitions as a single skater was at the 2012 Mexican National Championships where she performed 2 clean programs.

While on her last season as a single skater she founded, participated in and coached the first synchronized skating team, which represented Mexico in the 2013 World Synchronized Figure Skating Championships.
The team continued to compete in the 2014, 2015 and 2016 World Synchronized Figure Skating Championships.

Cantu Felix is the creator of the sit spin variation called AC-Sit. During many Competitions judges challenged the difficulty of this sit spin variation because they've never seen it before. After it was concluded that it was considered "difficult," a picture of this variation was included in the ISU Technical Panel Handbook for Singles.

Programs

Results

References

External links
 

Mexican female single skaters
1985 births
Living people
Sportspeople from Monterrey